The Guajira–Barranquilla xeric scrub is a xeric shrubland ecoregion in Colombia, Venezuela, and the ABC Islands (Leeward Antilles), covering an estimated area of .

Location 

The ecoregion occupies the Guajira Peninsula, the valley of Rancheria river and Guajira Department, covering parts of the northeastern coast of Venezuela to the ABC Islands (Leeward Antilles). These mountains trap some of the trade winds, causing mist. An important tourist destination in the area is Cabo de la Vela, and Klein Curaçao.

Ecology

Flora 

The ecoregion is dominated by thorny trees and succulents. Common species include Acacia glomerosa, Bourreria cumanensis, Bulnesia arborea, Caesalpinia coriaria, Copaifera venezolana, Croton sp., Gyrocarpus americanus, Hyptis sp., Jacquinia pungens, Malpighia glabra, Myrospermum frutescens, Opuntia caribaea, Pereskia guamacho, Piptadenia flava, Prosopis juliflora, and Stenocereus griseus.

Forests dominated by Lonchocarpus punctatus are often accompanied by Bunchosia odorata and Ayenia magna. Other forests exist in which Prosopis juliflora, Erythrina velutina and Clerodendron ternifolium are dominant. A variety of plant communities occur where two plant species are dominant. Examples include Astronium graveolens – Handroanthus billbergii, Haematoxylum brasiletto – Melochia tomentosa, Caesalpinia coriaria – Cordia curassavica, Bursera glabra – Castela erecta, Vitex cymosa – Libidibia coraria, Mimosa cabrera – Cordia curassavica, Bursera tomentosa – Bursera graveolens and Castela erecta – Parkinsonia praecox.

Fauna 

The ecoregion is notable for being the habitat of a large community of Caribbean flamingo (Phoenicopterus ruber), besides a diversity of birds and bats.

Conservation 
Most of the Serranía de Macuira lies within National Natural Park of Macuira. Nearby is the  Los Flamencos Sanctuary, which is a center of plant diversity for species of Hechtia, Salvia, and cactus. Of the 2700 species found within, approximately 30% are endemic.

References

External links 
  Martha Ligia Castellanos, Luis Carlos Pardo L. 2000. Caracterización y primera aproximación a la determinación del índice de biodiversidad en los suelos de la cuenca del arroyo Mekijanao, Serranía de la Macuira, Alta Guajira. En: Juan Carlos Pérez (editor) X Congreso Nacional de la Ciencia del Suelo. Programa y resúmenes. El suelo un componente del medio natural.  Medellín, Octubre 11 al 13 de 2000
  Edith González, Gabriel Guillot, Néstor Miranda, Diana Pombo (editores). 1990. Perfil Ambiental de Colombia. Colciencias. Escala. Bogotá.

Deserts and xeric shrublands
Ecoregions of Colombia
Ecoregions of Venezuela
Deserts of Colombia
Deserts of Venezuela

Natural history of Colombia
Natural history of Venezuela
Ecoregions of South America
Neotropical ecoregions